Verkhny Iskush (Ürge İsquş) is a rural locality (a selo) in Nizhneiskushinsky Selsoviet, Belokataysky District, Bashkortostan, Russia. The population was 109 as of 2010. There is 1 street.

Geography 
Verkhny Iskush is located 31 km northwest of Novobelokatay (the district's administrative centre) by road. Nizhny Iskush is the nearest rural locality.

References 

Rural localities in Belokataysky District